2015 Chad suicide bombings may refer to:

2015 N'Djamena bombings, in June and July
Baga Sola bombings, in October
December 2015 Chad suicide bombings